Estación Curicó,  is a railway station of the Empresa de los Ferrocarriles del Estado, located in Curicó, Chile . It is the main railway station in the Curicó Province. It is located on Maipú street.

Estación Curicó is part of the Red Sur EFE, the TerraSur inter-city service has a stop here.

The Ramal Licantén diverged from here, to the city of Licantén but the line was completely closed on 1977.

The nearby Curicó Bus Terminal is within walking distance from the Station.

Lines and trains 
The following lines and trains pass through or terminate at Estación Curicó:

Red Sur EFE
TerraSur inter-city service (Alameda - Chillán)
Expreso Maule inter-city service (Alameda - Linares)

Adjacent stations

External links 
 Empresa de los Ferrocarriles del Estado
 TerraSur

Curico
Buildings and structures in Maule Region
Transport in Maule Region